Francesco D'Isa is an Italian artist, writer, journalist and art curator. He has worked consistently in the field of erotic art, and also works on comics and a blog.

Art career
He studied philosophy in Florence, Italy. He is a self-taught artist.  He is a pioneer of digital art in Italy, but his drawing abilities let him work with traditional media as well. He was the co-founder of the Italian art & literature magazine "Mostro", where he published his first artworks. After that, his digital and traditional artworks were featured in many magazines around the world, like "Expose III", Ballistic Publishing (US); "Pixel Surgeons: Extreme manipulation of the figure in Photography", Mitchell Beazley Art & Design, Octopus ed. (UK); "Black magic, White Noise" ed "Illusive 3", Die Gestalten Verlag (Germany); "Design 360°", SanDu Culture ed. (China), GQ magazine (Italy), Inside Art (Italy). His accolade in contemporary art practice has been recognised with several art prizes. He has exhibited internationally from Italy, Germany, Holland, Switzerland, England, US, Australia, Russia, South America. His theory and practice has been extended as a workshop leader and lecturer in multimedia. In 2007 he became "Pornpope" founding the porn-artistic collective Pornsaints. He organized for Pornsaints international art exhibitions and parties in art galleries and erotic festivals, both in Europe and USA. Moreover, through his work as "Pornpope" many international porn stars like Kylie Ireland, Stoya, Madison Young, Sasha Grey and Ariel Rebel acted for him as muses, models and working partners. In 2009 his art has been chosen for the image of the Italian fashion brand bigfatfanny and featured at the fashion fair Pitti Immagine 2010.

Publications
In 2010, his comic "I., a comic drawn by everyone" become a regular blog of the Italian online newspaper Il Post; in November 2011 "I." has been published as an illustrated book by Nottempo (Italy). In 2013, his short stories has been published in "Selezione Naturale", Effequ (Italy) and "Toscani Maledetti", Piano B (Italy) and his short comic "Liebe macht nicht frei, baby!" as ebook for Retina Comics. His first novel, "Anna - storia di un palindromo" has been published in 2014 by Effequ (Italy), his second novel, "Ultimo piano (o porno totale)", by Imprimatur (Italy) in 2015, the third "La Stanza di Therese", by Tunué (Italy) in 2017. He regularly writes for Il Post (Italy) and RT Book Reviews (USA). Since 2015, he's head editor of the Italian magazine L'INDISCRETO.

Bibliography 

 "I.", (Nottetempo, 2011) 
 "Anna - storia di un palindromo" (Effequ, 2014) 
 "Ultimo piano (o porno totale)" (Imprimatur, 2015) 
 "Forse non tutti sanno che a Firenze..." (Newton Compton, 2015) 
 "Corso di psicologia generale e applicata" (Hoepli, 2015) 
 "È facile vivere bene a Firenze se sai cosa fare" (Newton Compton, 2016) 
 "La stanza di Therese" (Tunuè, 2017)

Notes

External links
 Official website Gizart
 Francesco D'Isa at Beinart
 Francesco D'Isa review of "In The Land of Retinal Delights" for Juxtapoz
 Francesco D'Isa at Indie Eye
 Intervista at PIG magazine (Italian)

Alt porn
Italian artists
Contemporary painters
Living people
1980 births
Italian male writers